The 2011 Walsall Metropolitan Borough Council election took place on 5 May 2011 to elect members of Walsall Metropolitan Borough Council in the West Midlands, England. One third of the council was up for election and the Conservative Party lost overall control of the council to no overall control.

After the election, the composition of the council was:
Conservative 28
Labour 26
Liberal Democrats 5
Independent 1

Background
The council leader Mike Bird was one of the Conservatives who were defending seats at the election, along with a member of his cabinet Barbara McCracken.

Election result
The results saw the Conservatives lose their majority on the council after Labour gained 8 seats, including 5 from the Conservatives. This meant the Conservatives had 28 councillors compared to 26 for Labour, leaving the Liberal Democrats, down one on five seats, holding the balance.

Following the election the Conservatives continued to run the council as a minority administration.

Ward results

References

2011 English local elections
2012
2010s in the West Midlands (county)